Ann Robinson  (born 1944) is a New Zealand studio glass artist who is internationally renowned for her glass casting work. Robinson is a recipient of the ONZM (2001) and a Lifetime Achievement Award by the American Glass Art Society (2006), and is a Laureate of the Arts Foundation of New Zealand (2006).

Training and early career 
Robinson first attended the Elam School of Fine Arts in the late 1960s majoring in sculpture – with bronze casting her specialisation, using the lost-wax casting (otherwise known as cire perdue) process. Robinson left before graduating but returned after a 15-year break. When she returned in the late 1970s she studied glass blowing which was then available. During this time she also began experimenting in lost-wax casting with glass.

After graduating from Elam in 1980, Robinson joined glass artists John Croucher and Garry Nash (ONZM) at Sunbeam Glass Works in Auckland. During her nine years with the studio glass blowing Robinson continued experimenting with wax glass casting. In 1989 Robinson left Sunbeam Glass Works and has since worked exclusively in the medium of caste glass.

Cast glass work 
Robinson is one of the pioneers of the art of lost-wax casting for glass. She undertook extensive research and experimentation in the 1970s to perfect the art. Early on, when developing this process, Robinson had a year where every piece she made broke. As Beazley states "[i]t is … something of a triumph that she has learnt to control cooling processes, which in her larger pieces can take as long as three weeks." The Director of Milford Galleries in Dunedin, Stephen Higginson, further emphasizes the time and space required for Robinson to create her works: some pieces can in fact take up to two months to cool and need to be alone in the kiln during this cooling process.

The lost-wax casting technique Robinson developed is a modified version of the bronze casting technique. It involves creating a plaster mould which is filled with molten wax. The mould is then removed (and can be reused) and the wax is encased in a heat-resistant covering and placed in the kiln. When the wax is burnt out, this cavity is then filled with molten glass.

In 1989, Robinson moved to one of Auckland's west coast beaches, Karekare. This move is often noted in reference to her art because of the influence of nature in her work, with the native plants there, particularly Nikau and flax (Phormium), featuring in her designs. As Powerhouse Museum states, "the spectacular environment of the Pacific region began to influence her designs." Robinson herself has said "I like the idea that my pieces encapsulate the music of the forest."

In 1992, Ann Robinson was one of 14 New Zealand ceramic and glass artists asked to contribute pieces for display in Treasures of the Underworld at the Seville Expo; Robinson was the only glass artist invited to contribute. Artists were requested to make something larger than they ever had before and given a phrase to drive their work: Robinson's was ‘Southern Hemisphere’. The vessels she created were 40–45 kg each and were evocative of the pacific. Robinson has more recently significantly increased the size of her pieces, experimenting with a piece that is 80 kg.

Robinson has a particular affinity and appreciation for vessels. For many years these were the sole focus of her craft. She subsequently explored other forms with a series of oversized native pods. Robinson's latest exhibitions, Brim and Capital, display a further development in her work with a more geometric refinement. Robinson attributes the changes in her art to her recent move from Karekare to a suburb of Auckland.

Critical reception and recognition 
Robinson's work features in the permanent collections of art galleries around the world, including the Victoria and Albert Museum in the United Kingdom, the Museum of New Zealand Te Papa Tongarewa, Corning Museum of Glass in the United States, the National Gallery of Victoria, Australia and Stradtmuseum, Germany. She has also regularly exhibited in both solo and group exhibitions in New Zealand and Internationally.

Robinson is sought after as a teacher and lecturer, including at the Pilchuck Glass School, Washington State, United States, at the Studio, Corning Museum of Glass in New York State, the United States, the Victoria and Albert Museum conference: Transparency in Glass, London, United Kingdom, the Canberra School of Art, Australia and at the North Lands Creative Glass 2003 Conference in Scotland.

Dan Klein comments, in his book Artists in Glass: Late Twentieth Century Master in Glass:
“the power of Ann Robinson’s work comes from its bold simplicity, its vivid colouring and its controlled forms”,   he further states: “the vessels change as the light changes, giving them a sort of inner life that adds to their magic.”

Dan Chappell, in 'Defining Light and Space', Art News, similarly stated, "the more you see of Robinson's work, with its soft, almost fecund, curved vessels and rhythmic patterns of nature, the more you realise hers is more a liberation of light – a release of the inner warmth and pulse from the very core of her creations."

Peter Simpson, in Craft Arts International, said, "Who knows what more is yet to come from an artist so resourceful, so gifted and with a divaricating habit?"

Wider influence 
In addition to her own art, Robinson is notable for the contribution she has made to the caste glass technique internationally and the development of caste glass artistry in NZ. Robinson is one of a small number of people in the world responsible for the development of the lost wax casting technique for glass. As D Wood, in Neus Glas states of Robinson, "she is an internationally respected doyenne of the genre."

Caste class has featured prominently in the glass art scene in New Zealand since Robinson's ground breaking work and newer glass artists, such as Layla Walters, Mike Crawford and Emily Siddell have been under Robinson's tutelage.

Solo exhibitions 
2013 Capital, Page Blackie Gallery, Wellington, NZBrim, FHE Galleries, Auckland, NZ
2012 The Thick and Thin of it, Milford Galleries, Queenstown
2010 Masterworks, Milford Galleries, Queenstown; Abundance, FHE Galleries, Auckland
2009 Celebrating the Recession, Milford Galleries, Queenstown
2008 Divaricate, FHE Galleries, Auckland; A Trans-Tasman Sampler, Axia Modern Art, Melbourne, Australia
2006 Ann Robinson, the Duane Reed Gallery, St Louis, Missouri, USA
2005 A Sombre Take, FHE Galleries, Auckland
2002-3 Pacific Rim: Ann Robinson's Glass, Museum of New Zealand, Te Papa Tangarewa, Wellington
2001   Ann Robinson: Light from New Zealand, Galerie Jean Claude Chapelotte, Luxembourg
2000   Old Zeal: New Zeal, Axia Modern Art, Melbourne, Australia
1999   Adrift, Elliott Brown Gallery, Seattle, Washington, USA
1998   Ann Robinson, Casting Light: A Survey of Glass Castings 1981–1997, Dowse Art Museum Wellington & New Gallery, Auckland
1997   Tall Poppies, Lopdell House Gallery, Waitakere City; A Point in Time, Masterworks Gallery, Auckland, NZ
1995   Ann Robinson: A Survey, Elliott Brown Gallery, Seattle, Washington, USA
1994   Ann Robinson at Masterworks, Masterworks Gallery, Auckland; Ann Robinson, Galerie L, Hamburg, Germany; From Fantasy to Function V. Kurts Bingham Gallery, Memphis, Tennessee, USA
1993   Ann Robinson, Grand opening at Elliot Brown Gallery, Seattle, Washington, USA
1992   Masterworks Gallery, Parnell, Auckland
1984   Artisan Centre, Auckland

Selected group exhibitions 
2012   Chasen, Milford Galleries, Queenstown
2009   Luminaries, Sabia Gallery, Sydney
2003-4 Southern Exposure, NZ Society of Artists in Glass travelling exhibition to Ebell of Denmark
2001   Transparent Things, National Gallery of Australia, Canberra, Australia
2000   Creativity and Collaboration, Pilchuck Glass School's 30 Years; Bumbershoot 2000 Seattle Center, Seattle, Washington, USA
1999   New Zealand Glass, Axia Modern Art, Melbourne, Australia
1997   Inaugural Exhibition, John Elder Gallery, New York City; Art in Glass ’97, Editions Gallery, Melbourne, Australia; 	Ledbetter Lusk Gallery, Memphis, Tennessee, USA; Elliot Brown Gallery, Seattle, WA Frantisek Vizner and Daniel Clayman
1996   Introductions VII, Lisa Kurts Gallery, Memphis, Tennessee, USA
1995   The Vessel Aesthetic, Kavesh Gallery, Ketchum, Idaho, USA; A Powerful Presence: Pilchuck Glass School's 25 years, Bumvershoot, Rainier Room at the Seattle Center, Seattle, Washington, USA
1994   Breaking the Mold: New Kilnformed Glass, Heller Gallery, Palm Beach, Florida, USA; Glass from the Pacific Rim, Art Department Gallery, San Francisco State University, San Francisco, California, USA
1993   Parriott, Perkins and Robinson, Chicago International New Art Forms Exposition at Navy Pier, Chicago, Illinois, USA; Annual Pilchuck Exhibition, William Traver Gallery, Seattle, Washington, USA; Pilchuck Glass Exhibition, SeaTac Airport, Seattle, Washington, USA
1992   International Directions in Glass, Art Gallery of Western Australia, Perth, Australia; Treasures of the Underworld, Serville, Spain
1990   New Zealand Crafts Council, Wellington
1988   World Glass Now ’88 Hokkaido Museum of Modern Art, Hakkaido, Japan; Stones in Glass Houses, Villas Gallery, Wellington
1986   Sunbeam Glassworks, Dowse Art Museum, Lower Hutt, Wellington

Honours and awards 
2006 – American Glass Society Lifetime Achievement Award for Services to Glass
2006 – Arts Foundation of New Zealand Laureate
2006 – Waitakere City Arts Laureate Award
2002 – John Britten Award for contribution to design
2001 – Appointed Officer of the New Zealand Order of Merit, for services to glass art, in the 2001 Queen's Birthday Honours
1987 – Winstone Biennale Award
1986 – Phillips Glass Award
1984 – Phillips Glass Award

References

External links 
 Ann Robinson
 Ann Robinson: Glass Artist New Zealand Crafts 18, Spring 1986
 Ann Robinson, Casting Light: A Survey of Glass Castings 1981-1997 (Lower Hutt: The Dowse Art Museum, 1998), 

New Zealand glass artists
Women glass artists
1944 births
Living people
Officers of the New Zealand Order of Merit
Elam Art School alumni